In the History of Atlanta Falcons head coaches Vince Lombardi was initially pursued as the first Atlanta coach, but after deciding to stay with Green Bay, was asked for recommendations for Atlanta's first coach. At the time, Lombardi did not recommend Hecker and the Atlanta owner, Rankin Smith Jr., thinking Lombardi was trying to pull one over on him, decided to hire Hecker. The next three years would be an exercise in frustration for Hecker who managed just four wins in his 31 games at the helm. One bad omen of this misery came in the team's first-ever exhibition game when Falcons' kicker Wade Traynham completely missed the ball on the kickoff. Following the inaugural 3-11 season, the Falcons were plagued by injuries in 1967 and declined to a 1-12-1 mark, the lone win coming in a one-point midseason contest against the Minnesota Vikings.

When Atlanta began the 1968 NFL season by dropping their first three games, Hecker was fired on October 1 and replaced by former Viking head coach Norm Van Brocklin. After reaching a settlement on the remaining two years of his contract, Hecker accepted the defensive coordinator position with the New York Giants on February 12, 1969. He had also been under consideration for a post with the Redskins, who had just hired the previously-retired Lombardi.

Norm Van Brocklin and Jerry Glanville
On October 1, 1968, Norm Van Brocklin took over as head coach of the Atlanta Falcons, replacing Norb Hecker, who had started the season with three defeats, extending the team losing streak to 10 games. Over the next seven seasons, Van Brocklin had mixed results, putting together a 37-49-3 mark. He led the team to its first winning season in 1971 with a 7-6-1 record, then challenged for a playoff spot two years later with a 9-5 mark. However, after winning just two of his first eight games in 1974, he was fired.

During Jerry Glanville's time in the National Football League, he was the Special Teams/Defensive Assistant for the Detroit Lions from 1974–1976, the Secondary Coach for the Atlanta Falcons from 1977–1978 and the Defensive Coordinator from 1979–1982, the Secondary coach of the Buffalo Bills in 1983, the defensive coordinator of the Houston Oilers (now known as the Tennessee Titans) from 1984–1985 and the head coach from 1986–1989, and the Atlanta Falcons from 1990–1993. He became infamous for trading future superstar quarterback Brett Favre to the Green Bay Packers in 1991. While still coaching in the NFL, Glanville was famous for often leaving tickets at will-call for Elvis Presley, (although in a recent interview with WDYT, a news/talk radio station in Charlotte, North Carolina, he told the show hosts that he only left tickets for Elvis at one pre-season NFL game in Memphis, but the story took on a life of its own), wearing all-black to be easily recognized by his players, and driving replicas of vehicles driven by James Dean.

Dan Reeves
In 1996, Dan Reeves accepted the head coaching job for the Atlanta Falcons. The year before the Falcons had gone 3-13, and they had done little to improve their personnel. Yet by 1998, Reeves led the team to a 14-2 record and his record 9th Super Bowl appearance on the sidelines. That year was particularly tumultuous for Reeves, who underwent open heart surgery to repair three blocked arteries midway through the season. Although the team lost Super Bowl XXXIII by a 34-19 margin against Reeves's old team the Denver Broncos, Reeves was widely hailed for the team's turnaround, and was again awarded the Coach of the Year honor. Again, however, Reeves failed to maintain the level of excellence he had attained early in his post, and he was fired with three games remaining in the 2003 season.

Jim L. Mora
Jim L. Mora was the coach for the Atlanta Falcons from 2004 to 2006. In 2006, the national media and the Falcons fans had high expectations. However, Mora led the Falcons to a 7-9 record, losing his final three games, including two at home, and missed the playoffs for a second straight year. In his second season as Falcons coach, when he was playing the Philadelphia Eagles in a rematch from the 2004 NFC Championship, Mora was seen smelling ammonia capsules on the sidelines during a Monday Night Football broadcast. John Madden noted that some coaches use the capsules during games, although they are mostly for players' use.

2000's
On December 14, 2006, while the Falcons were still statistically alive in their quest for the playoffs, Mora said during a radio interview with Dave "Softy" Mahler and former Huskies teammate/roommate Hugh Millen on Seattle sports-talk radio station KJR-AM that if it were offered, he would take the head coaching job at the University of Washington (a job that was not open), "even if [the Falcons] were in a playoff run." While Mora later claimed that he was only kidding, he was criticized by many Falcons fans as well as members of the national media who claimed that making such comments was irresponsible.

Following the season, the Atlanta Falcons announced that they had fired Jim Mora. Arthur Blank told the media,  Mora turned to broadcasting after being fired from the Falcons when he became a contributor to NBC's playoff coverage.

List of coaches

References

See also
 List of Atlanta Falcons head coaches

Atlanta Falcons